Betty LaDuke (née Bernstein; born 1933) is an American artist and writer from Oregon. She is the mother of activist Winona LaDuke.

Early life
LaDuke was born in the Bronx, New York, in 1933. She attended the High School of Music and Art in New York starting at age sixteen, and later studied at Denver University, the Cleveland Institute of Art. In the fifties she received a scholarship which allowed her to study art at Mexico's Instituto Allende from 1953 through 1956. During her time in Mexico she lived with the indigenous Otomi, whose concern with the preservation of their heritage profoundly influenced LaDuke's work.

Works
 Play Free (1968)
India: The Hindu Marriage, (1972)
Tuk Tuk, Samosir Island, Sumatra (1974)
Ubud, Bali, (1974)
Coming of Age Dance, Sumatra, (1974)
Mexico, (1978)
Mexico, Easter, (1978)
Mexico, Easter Celebration, (1978)
Borneo: Rite of Passage, (1980)
Nicaragua, (1982)
Haitian Art: Five Women Painters, (1984) Kalliope: A Journal of Women's Art and Literature
Behind the Walls Birds Sing, (1986)
Eritrea/Ethiopia: Where Have All the Fathers Gone (1998)
Africa: women's art, women's lives (1998)

Collections and exhibits
LaDuke's work is held by the Portland Art Museum.

References

External links
 

1933 births
Living people
American women artists
Artists from Oregon
Cleveland Institute of Art alumni
People from the Bronx
Writers from Oregon
Artists from the Bronx
21st-century American women